Carrick is a surname. Notable people with the surname include:

Alexander Carrick (1882–1966), Scottish sculptor
Bill Carrick (1873–1932), American baseball player
Connor Carrick (born 1994), American ice hockey player
Dale Carrick (born 1994), Scottish footballer
David Carrick (born 1975) Police officer and serial rapist
Donald Carrick (1906–1997), Canadian lawyer, political figure, Olympic boxer, and national golf champion
Edward Carrick (1905–1998), British art designer, film director and author
Ethel Carrick (1872–1952), English-born Post-Impressionist painter
James Stewart Carrick (1855–1923), Scottish rugby union and cricket player
John Carrick (disambiguation), various
Mervyn Carrick (born 1946), Northern Ireland politician
Michael Carrick (born 1981), English footballer
Phil Carrick (1952–2000), English cricketer
Sir Roger Carrick (born 1937), British former diplomat and author
Sam Carrick (born 1992), Canadian ice hockey player
Samuel Carrick (1760–1809), American Presbyterian minister
Thomas Heathfield Carrick (1802–1874), English portrait miniature painter
William Carrick (1827–1878), Scottish-Russian artist and photographer
Willie Carrick (born 1952), Irish former footballer